The 2017 Pacific hurricane season was significantly less active than the previous three Pacific hurricane seasons, featuring eighteen named storms, nine hurricanes, and four major hurricanes. Despite the considerable amount of activity, most of the storms were weak and short-lived. The season officially started on May 15 in the eastern Pacific Ocean, and on June 1 in the central Pacific; they both ended on November 30. These dates conventionally delimit the period of each year when most tropical cyclones form in the respective regions. However, the formation of tropical cyclones is possible at any time of the year, as illustrated in 2017 by the formation of the season's first named storm, Tropical Storm Adrian, on May 9. At the time, this was the earliest formation of a tropical storm on record in the eastern Pacific. The season saw near-average activity in terms of accumulated cyclone energy (ACE), in stark contrast to the extremely active seasons in 2014, 2015, and 2016; and for the first time since 2012, no tropical cyclones formed in the Central Pacific basin. However, for the third year in a row, the season featured above-average activity in July, with the ACE value being the fifth highest for the month. Damage across the basin reached $375.28 million (2017 USD), while 45 people were killed by the various storms.

Prior to the start of this season, the National Hurricane Center (NHC) changed its policy to permit issuance of advisories on disturbances that were not yet tropical cyclones but had a high chance to become one, and were expected to bring tropical storm or hurricane conditions to landmasses within 48 hours. As a result of this change, watches and warnings could be issued by local authorities. Such systems would be termed as "Potential Tropical Cyclones". The first system to receive this designation was Potential Tropical Cyclone Fourteen-E, which developed into Tropical Storm Lidia south-southeast of the Baja California Peninsula on August 30.



Seasonal forecasts

Forecasts include weekly and monthly changes in important factors that help determine the number of tropical storms, hurricanes, and major hurricanes within a particular year. According to the National Oceanic and Atmospheric Administration (NOAA), the average hurricane season in the Eastern and Central Pacific between 1981 and 2010 contained approximately 15 tropical storms, 7 hurricanes, and 3 major hurricanes. The NOAA generally classifies a season as above average, average, or below average based on the cumulative ACE index, but occasionally the number of tropical storms, hurricanes, and major hurricanes within a hurricane season is also considered.

On May 25, 2017, the National Oceanic and Atmospheric Administration released its annual forecast, predicting an 80% chance of a near- to above-average season in both the Eastern and Central Pacific basins, with a total of 14–20 named storms, 6–11 hurricanes, and 3–7 major hurricanes. During May 28, the Servicio Meteorológico Nacional (SMN) issued its first forecast for the season, predicting a total of 16 named storms, 10 hurricanes, and 6 major hurricanes to develop.

Seasonal summary

The accumulated cyclone energy (ACE) for the 2017 Pacific hurricane season as calculated by Colorado State University using data from the National Hurricane Center was 100.7 units.

Although hurricane season in the eastern Pacific does not officially begin until May 15, and on June 1 in the central Pacific, activity began several days prior with the formation of a tropical depression on May 9. This was the earliest formation of a tropical cyclone on record, a record that stood until broken by Tropical Depression One-E in 2020. When it intensified into Tropical Storm Adrian a few hours later, the system became the earliest named storm on record in the basin, a record that stood until broken by Tropical Storm Andres in 2021. Near normal activity occurred in June, with Tropical Storm Calvin formed on June 11, and Hurricane Dora on June 25. For the third year in a row, July featured above average activity, with the fifth highest ACE value for that month on record.

Systems

Tropical Storm Adrian

On May 5, the National Hurricane Center (NHC) indicated that an area of low pressure was forecast to form south of Mexico over subsequent days, with the possibility of tropical cyclone development thereafter. The depression intensified into Tropical Storm Adrian six hours later. Initially, forecasts expected the small storm to intensify into a powerful hurricane. Shortly after reaching peak intensity early on May 10, an unexpected increase in mid-level wind shear caused Adrian to quickly weaken and degenerate to a remnant low by 00:00 UTC on May 11. Adrian's remnant low persisted for another day, before dissipating on May 12.

Tropical Storm Beatriz

A tropical wave emerged off the western coast of Africa on May 18 and entered the East Pacific about a week later, where steady organization led to the formation of a tropical depression around 12:00 UTC on May 31. Embedded within southwesterly flow around a large upper-level trough across northern Mexico, the depression moved steadily northeast in a favorable environment, and it intensified into Tropical Storm Beatriz by 06:00 UTC on June 1.

In the state of Oaxaca, flights out of Bahías de Huatulco International Airport were cancelled and schools were closed until June 3. Dozens of roads were impassable due to mudslides and flooding; numerous locales received over 4 in (102 mm) of rain, with rainfall at a maximum of 19.07 in (484.4 mm) in Huatulco. Numerous landslides caused significant disruption across the state; the storm blocked large areas of  Federal Highway 200 in Oaxaca. A landslide in San Marcial Ozolotepec killed two girls and buried several houses, while another in San Carlos Yautepec killed a woman. As of June 4, a total of six people have been killed—five in Oaxaca and two in Tehuantepec. Damage in Oaxaca reached MXN$3.2 billion (US$172 million).

Tropical Storm Calvin

In the second week of June, the NHC forecast the development of a broad area of low pressure a few hundred miles south of Mexico over the next several days. It was slow to organize initially due to moderate easterly wind shear as it drifted northwestwards; by 18:00 UTC on June 12, however, the tropical depression intensified into Tropical Storm Calvin. Just 12 hours later, Calvin dissipated into a remnant low. The remnants of the storm caused heavy rainfall and some flooding in the area, however no fatalities were reported. Less than two weeks after Tropical Storm Beatriz, Calvin affected similar areas of Mexico and inflicted additional damage which resulted in at least 70 million pesos (US$3.88 million) in Oaxaca.

Hurricane Dora

A large gyre developed over Central America around June 15. A trough detached from the gyre and drifted across just south of the Gulf of Tehuantepec between June 21 and June 23. By June 23, a tropical wave associated with the remnants of Tropical Storm Bret in the Atlantic began merging with the trough. A surface low formed early on the next day, followed by the development of a tropical depression at 18:00 UTC. At 06:00 UTC on June 25, the depression intensified into Tropical Storm Dora. Thereafter, favorable conditions including low wind shear and warm sea surface temperatures allowed Dora to undergo rapid intensification, becoming a hurricane at 06:00 UTC on June 26 and a Category 2 hurricane about six hours later.

Dora remained a Category 2 hurricane for about 12 more hours before beginning to rapidly weaken over cooler sea surface temperatures and in an environment of drier air, falling to Category 1 intensity at 06:00 UTC on June 27 and deteriorating to a tropical storm around 18:00 UTC. The storm later degenerated into a remnant low near Socorro Island early on June 28, after all of the storm's convection had been diminished. The remnant low moved slowly over the eastern Pacific before dissipating early on July 1. The outer bands of Dora brought heavy rains to Guerrero, resulting in flash floods that inundated 20 homes. Overall damage was minor, however.

Hurricane Eugene

Hurricane Eugene developed from a disturbance located 765 mi (1,230 km) south of the southern tip of the Baja California Peninsula on July 7. On the following day, Eugene underwent a period of rapid intensification; in an 18-hour period starting at 21:00 UTC on July 8, Eugene intensified from a tropical storm with  winds to a Category 3 hurricane with  winds, making it the first major hurricane of the season. However, by 12 hours later, the entrainment of dry air caused Eugene to weaken to a Category 2 hurricane, and due to traveling over cooler waters, Eugene weakened to a tropical storm on the following day. As the coverage of deep convection steadily dwindled, Eugene fell to tropical depression intensity around 15:00 UTC on July 12, and degenerated to a remnant low six hours later.

On July 10 alone, lifeguards in Huntington Beach made 200 rescues while 600 were made in Los Angeles County; lifeguards also responded to 700 medical emergencies.

Hurricane Fernanda

Late on July 10, the NHC began monitoring a broad area of low pressure several hundred miles southwest of Manzanillo. Contrary to predictions of gradual development, the disturbance rapidly organized into a tropical depression by 03:00 UTC on July 12, and further strengthened to become Tropical Storm Fernanda around 15:00 UTC that day. The nascent cyclone initially battled moderate northeasterly wind shear, with its low-level circulation displaced to the northeastern edge of the deep convection. This period of unfavorable upper-level winds was brief, and soon afterwards Fernanda commenced a period of rapid intensification, intensifying into a hurricane at 21:00 UTC on July 13. A well-defined eye formed within a growing central dense overcast, and Fernanda further intensified into a major hurricane early on July 14. Only six hours later, the system was upgraded to a Category 4 hurricane. At 10.9°N, Fernanda became the second strongest hurricane to occur at such a low latitude in the Eastern Pacific, only behind Hurricane Olaf (2015).

With expansive upper-level outflow and spiral bands, a distinct eye, and a symmetric central dense overcast, Fernanda attained peak winds of  around 03:00 UTC on July 15. A series of microwave passes around that time began to indicate the formation of a secondary eyewall that halted the cyclone's development as it tracked west-northwest to northwest. The eyewall replacement cycle concluded early on July 16, allowing Fernanda to remain a powerful hurricane amid favorable environmental conditions. By late on July 18, however, cooler ocean temperatures and a more stable environment prompted the storm's weakening trend. Fernanda fell below hurricane intensity shortly before entering the Central Pacific as it succumbed to stronger southwesterly wind shear, becoming a tropical depression at 03:00 UTC on July 21, and after failing to produce sustained deep convection, degenerated to a remnant low about 500 miles (805 km) east of Hilo, Hawaii, by 21:00 UTC on July 22.

Tropical Depression Eight-E

A low-pressure trough began producing disorganized convection over the waters of the Pacific Ocean, well to the south of Baja California Peninsula, on July 14. Despite only marginally conducive environmental conditions, the disturbance began to show signs of organization two days later, and it attained tropical depression status by 06:00 UTC on July 17. Strong west-northwesterly wind shear confined the storm's intermittent bursts of convection well to the southwest of its low-level circulation, and the depression consequently failed to produce winds above . The system's center later degenerated into a low-pressure trough within the Intertropical Convergence Zone, prompting the NHC to discontinue advisories at 21:00 UTC on July 20.

Tropical Storm Greg

On July 12, the NHC forecast the formation of a broad area of low pressure south of Mexico over subsequent days. The disturbance formed two days later and slowly organized into a tropical depression by 15:00 UTC on July 17. The tropical cyclone battled strong west-northwesterly wind shear after formation, intensifying into Tropical Storm Greg by 09:00 UTC on July 18, as deep convection burst near the center. However, the storm remained in a steady state for several days thereafter, despite continued predictions of intensification. Ultimately, given global models' poor handling of the environment, NHC lowered their intensity forecast for Greg. The cyclone continued west for the remainder of its life and maintained a similar convective structure, with intermittent bursts of deep convection near the center. Approaching the Central Pacific, Greg's low-level circulation became increasingly difficult to locate as it moved into a cooler, drier environment intertwined by increasing southerly wind shear, and the system weakened to a tropical depression around 21:00 UTC on July 25. It degenerated to a remnant low 24 hours later.

Hurricane Hilary

Part of an exceptionally active July, the NHC began highlighting the far eastern reaches of the Pacific basin on July 19 for tropical development in later days. A large area of disturbed weather progressed westward across Costa Rica later that day, steadily organizing into a tropical depression by 15:00 UTC on July 21. The cyclone failed to organize immediately after formation, and its low-level center migrated to the southern extent of associated convection. By 03:00 UTC on July 23, though, better defined banding features and a more organized convective structure led the NHC to designate the system as Tropical Storm Hilary. Over the coming hours, the cyclone's convective structure evolved into a small central dense overcast while hints of an eye became apparent; in accordance with satellite estimates, Hilary was upgraded to a hurricane at 09:00 UTC on July 24. A moist environment and warm ocean waters propelled Hilary to its peak as a Category 2 hurricane with winds of  24 hours later, at which time its core was most symmetric. After maintaining its intensity, the hurricane began to weaken late on July 26 as northerly wind shear increased. It fell back to tropical storm intensity around 03:00 UTC on July 27, and ultimately degenerated to a remnant low four days later.

Hurricane Irwin

On July 16, the NHC highlighted the expected formation of an area of low pressure south of Mexico later that week. A tropical wave began producing disorganized cloudiness three days later, and the broad system slowly organized into a tropical depression by 15:00 UTC on July 22. Its structure changed little after formation, impacted by strong wind shear; despite this, satellite wind data indicated the cyclone intensified into Tropical Storm Irwin by 09:00 UTC on July 23. Over the next 24 hours, deep convection began to wrap around the center and a mid-level eye formed as environmental conditions improved; by 09:00 UTC on July 25, Irwin intensified into a hurricane. Although coolest cloudtops were located in the western semicircle of the system, a well-defined eye and convection in the eyewall propelled Irwin to its peak with winds of  late on July 25. Almost immediately, outflow from nearby Hurricane Hilary increased wind shear over the system and caused it to begin weakening; Irwin rapidly fell to tropical storm strength around 15:00 UTC on July 26. Contrary to projections of continued weakening, however, the storm's cloud pattern maintained or even improved over subsequent days as it passed over marginal ocean temperatures. Finally, after losing its deep convection and being reduced to a swirl of low-level clouds, Irwin was declared a remnant low around 21:00 UTC on August 1.

Tropical Depression Eleven-E

On July 28, the NHC noted the possibility of an area of low pressure well south of Mexico developing over subsequent days. An area of disorganized showers and thunderstorms associated with a tropical wave materialized three days later, but little change occurred thereafter. Early on August 3, a surface circulation formed in association with concentrating convection, and this process led to the formation of a tropical depression by 06:00 UTC the next day. Falling short of the tropical storm criteria, the short-lived depression was declared a remnant low at 18:00 UTC that day. The lingering vortex slowed its northwestward motion and executed a counter-clockwise loop, before dissipating completely 205 miles (335 km) southwest of the Baja California Peninsula on August 8.

Tropical Storm Jova

The NHC began monitoring a strong tropical wave over the eastern Caribbean on August 3. The feature pushed westward, developing into Hurricane Franklin before making landfall on the Yucatán, and attaining its peak as a Category 1 hurricane before making landfall near Vega de Alatorre, Veracruz on August 10. Although its low-level circulation dissipated, the NHC in days prior noted the potential for Franklin's mid-level remnants to reform in the East Pacific. The remnants of Franklin induced a surface low off the coast of southwestern Mexico on August 11, and steady organization led to the formation of Tropical Storm Jova by 03:00 UTC the next day. On a westward course, Jova was plagued by strong wind shear from an area of high pressure over northwestern Mexico, with a very disorganized appearance on satellite. After lacking sufficient organization to be declared a tropical cyclone, the storm was declared a remnant low around 03:00 UTC on August 14.

Hurricane Kenneth

On August 12, the NHC noted the potential for an area of low pressure to form well south of Baja California Peninsula during the following days. A large area of disturbed weather developed two days later as predicted; however, organization was slow to occur, and a tropical depression only formed four days later, around 15:00 UTC on August 18. The newly formed cyclone embarked on a west to west-northwest course, intensifying into Tropical Storm Kenneth early on August 19 and further into a hurricane by 15:00 UTC on August 20. Despite forecasts of only slight additional intensification, Kenneth rapidly intensified, with the eye feature warming dramatically and the surrounding cloud tops cooling. Progressively cooler sea surface temperatures and increasing wind shear caused Kenneth to steadily weaken following the intensification trend, with its inner core eroding and low-level circulation becoming displaced. By 21:00 UTC on August 22, the storm weakened below hurricane strength. On the following day, at 21:00 UTC, Kenneth was declared to be post-tropical. The remnant low meandered due to weak steering currents, before finally dissipating on August 27.

Tropical Storm Lidia

A vigorous tropical wave emerged off the western coast of Africa on August 16; it crossed Central America into the East Pacific on August 25. Part of a large cyclonic gyre, the disturbance failed to organize for several days—despite already producing tropical storm-force winds—amid high wind shear from Hurricane Harvey in the Gulf of Mexico. After Harvey weakened, however, an increase in the system's organization led to the formation of Tropical Storm Lidia around 18:00 UTC on August 30. Flow between a subtropical high and upper-level trough directed Lidia on a north-northwest track, and the cyclone strengthened to a peak of  later on August 31. Lidia continued to weaken as it moved northwest, degenerating to a remnant low around 06:00 UTC on September 3 and dissipating twelve hours later.

Hurricane Otis

On September 8, Atlantic Hurricane Katia made landfall in Mexico, dissipating on September 9. However, its mid-level circulation survived, and eventually spawned an area of low pressure off the coast of Mexico. On September 11, the system organized into Tropical Depression Fifteen-E. It strengthened into a tropical storm at 00:00 UTC on September 13 and reached its initial peak intensity of 40 mph with its pressure falling to 1003 mb. However, the upgrade was not made operationally and the system weakened back to a tropical depression 12 hours later without being named. During the next several days the depression slowly drifted westward and struggled to intensify as it was situated within a dry environment. Some models even predicted the depression would dissipate without ever reaching tropical storm strength again. However, by 15:00 UTC on September 16, the system unexpectedly started to organize with a small area of deep convection developing near its low-level center, which allowed it to finally restrengthen into a tropical storm later that day, at which time it was given the name Otis. Only marginal strengthening was forecast, but Otis unexpectedly rapidly intensified into a Category 2 hurricane by 15:00 UTC on September 17, despite low ocean temperatures, dry air, and increased wind shear. Twelve hours after developing a well-defined eye, Otis started weakening at a remarkable rate, losing most of its deep convection due to low ocean surface temperatures, until it weakened into a remnant low on September 19.

Hurricane Max

On September 9, the NHC mentioned the possibility for an area of low pressure to form south of Mexico over later days. A trough of low pressure materialized the next day, steadily organizing into a tropical depression near the southwestern coast of Mexico around 15:00 UTC on September 13. Despite forecasts of little or no intensification, the newly formed cyclone intensified into Tropical Storm Max six hours later. Quick intensification ensued as the storm improved in structure and developed a well-defined eye, prompting the NHC to upgrade Max to a hurricane around 12:00 UTC on September 14. The mountainous terrain of inland Mexico severely disrupted Max's circulation, causing it to degenerate into a remnant low by 09:00 UTC on September 15, dissipating over Mexico later that day.

In preparation for Max, about 788 people evacuated to temporary shelters. Throughout Guerrero, over 1,500 homes were inundated by floodwaters or damaged by strong winds that ripped off roofs. Over 100 trees were downed, mudslides and sinkholes closed several roads (including Mexican Federal Highway 200), and telephone service was cut. At the height of the storm, 126,503 Comisión Federal de Electricidad customers lost electricity. A bridge between Cruz Grande and Copala was severely damaged, and access to Juchitán de Zaragoza was severed due to a flooded highway. One of 17 rapidly-rising rivers swept away a residence and two neighbors who attempted to rescue the homeowner; one of the neighbors died, constituting one of two deaths attributed to the storm. At least 3,000 residents across five municipalities in Guerrero were stranded. Waves of 10–16 ft (3–5 m) battered the coastline, where six ships were sunk. Damage from the hurricane was estimated to be around US$13 million.

Hurricane Norma

On September 10, the NHC started to monitor an area of low pressure — associated with the tropical wave that spawned Hurricane Irma in the Atlantic basin — well south of Manzanillo, Mexico. The disturbance gradually organized during the following days and by 09:00 UTC on September 14 the system was noted to develop a well-defined center and spiral banding. This led to the formation of Tropical Storm Norma, operationally skipping tropical depression status. In post-season analysis, it was determined that Norma had formed as a tropical depression three hours earlier, and that it did not strengthen into a tropical storm until 12:00 UTC. At this time warnings were being issued for the southern portions of the Baja California Peninsula as Norma was forecast to become a significant hurricane and make landfall in the area. However, its broad circulation and the entrainment of dry air quickly became an impediment in doing so. Norma then weakened back to a tropical storm at 12:00 UTC later that day while becoming stationary, though a developing ridge over Mexico began to move the storm slowly towards the north. Norma maintained its intensity the next day and continued being slowly steered by the ridge towards a northwesterly to west-northwesterly path, all tropical storm warnings were discontinued as Norma started to shift its track more to the west. The cyclone continued weakening for several days as it slowly drifted to the west, until finally degenerating into a remnant low at 03:00 UTC on September 20. The remnants of Norma persisted for a little over 2 days before they completely dissipated.

Tropical Storm Pilar

During the week of September 18, the NHC began monitoring a tropical wave,  as it spawned a broad area of low pressure located offshore of the southwestern coast of Mexico. The disturbance lacked any significant organization until September 23 at around 21:00 UTC when the system was noted to developed surface winds of over  becoming Tropical Depression Eighteen-E. The depression organized into a tropical storm six hours later and was given the name Pilar, the sixteenth named storm of the annual Pacific hurricane season. By 09:00 UTC on September 24, Pilar continued to track north along the coast, with warnings being issued for the southwestern coast of Mexico. However, early on September 25, these warnings were discontinued, as Tropical Storm Pilar showed signs of weakening mainly due to land interaction, and was reduced to a tropical depression before ultimately dissipating at around 21:00 UTC later that same day. 
Although Pilar did not make landfall as a tropical cyclone, heavy rainfall was reported in Puerto Vallarta, Mexico, to the northeast of Islas Marías, and in other areas along the Mexican coastline.

Tropical Storm Ramon

On October 3, the NHC noted a high chance of tropical development for an area of low pressure, to the south of Mexico. The system increased in intensity and became Tropical Storm Ramon later on the same day. Due to wind shear from a large anticyclone to its north, the storm did not intensify much further. Although Ramon was forecast to linger over open waters as it moved westward, this did not occur and the system quickly grew disorganized. Ramon weakened into a tropical depression on October 4, having lasted as a tropical storm only for 18 hours. As it moved westward, Ramon continued to weaken, until it finally degenerated into a trough of low pressure by 00:00 UTC the following day. The National Hurricane Center issued its last advisory on the degenerate system at 09:00 UTC, on October 5. The remnant low dissipated later that day.

Tropical Storm Selma

	
Late on October 24, the NHC began to monitor the formation of an area of low pressure located south of eastern Central America. The system quickly gained organization as it moved northwestwards, and was declared Tropical Storm Selma at 09:00 UTC on October 27. This marked only the second time that an Eastern Pacific tropical cyclone became a tropical storm east of 90°W, the other being Alma of 2008. With the environment thought to be generally conducive to intensification, Selma was forecast to gain some strength before moving northwards into Central America. However, with wind shear stronger than expected, this did not occur, and Selma never strengthened beyond minimal tropical storm status. Eventually, at 12:00 UTC on October 28, Selma made landfall just southeast of San Salvador, El Salvador, becoming the first Eastern Pacific tropical cyclone to make landfall anywhere in El Salvador. Once over land, Selma weakened quickly, and degenerated into a post-tropical cyclone by 21:00 UTC on October 28. Selma's remnant dissipated overland within the next several hours.

Heavy rains produced by Selma and a cold front resulted in flooding that killed seven people in Honduras. Dozens of landslides damaged homes and blocked roadways while 13 rivers topped their banks. Approximately 38,000 people required evacuation and more than 3,000 homes were flooded as 13 rivers topped their banks. Rainfall extended into Nicaragua, causing floods that claimed another 10 lives in areas recovering from Tropical Storm Nate two weeks prior.

Storm names

The following names were used for named storms that formed in the northeastern Pacific Ocean during 2017. No names were retired, so this list will be used again in the 2023 season. This same list was used in the 2011 season.

For storms that form in the Central Pacific Hurricane Center's area of responsibility, encompassing the area between 140 degrees west and the International Date Line, all names are used in a series of four rotating lists. The next four names that were slated for use in 2017 are shown below; however, none of them were used.

The usage of the name "Hilary" in July garnered some negative attention relating to former U.S. presidential candidate Hillary Clinton. People also took to Twitter to poke fun at the name and at Clinton with political jokes.

Season effects
This is a table of all the storms that formed in the 2017 Pacific hurricane season. It includes their duration, names, areas affected, damages, and death totals. Deaths in parentheses are additional and indirect (an example of an indirect death would be a traffic accident), but were still related to that storm. Damage and deaths include totals while the storm was extratropical, a tropical wave, or a low, and all the damage figures are in 2017 USD.

See also

 Weather of 2017
 Timeline of the 2017 Pacific hurricane season
List of Pacific hurricanes
 Pacific hurricane season
Tropical cyclones in 2017
 2017 Atlantic hurricane season
 2017 Pacific typhoon season
 2017 North Indian Ocean cyclone season
 South-West Indian Ocean cyclone seasons: 2016–17, 2017–18
 Australian region cyclone seasons: 2016–17, 2017–18
 South Pacific cyclone seasons: 2016–17, 2017–18
 South Atlantic tropical cyclone

Footnotes

References

External links

 National Hurricane Center Website
 National Hurricane Center's Eastern Pacific Tropical Weather Outlook
Servicio Meteorológico Nacional Website 
NHC 2017 Pacific hurricane season archive

 
Pacific hurricane seasons
2017 Epac